Villa Santina is a comune (municipality) in the Province of Udine in the Italian region Friuli-Venezia Giulia, located about  northwest of Trieste and about  northwest of Udine.

Villa Santina borders the following municipalities:  Enemonzo, Lauco, Raveo, Tolmezzo and Verzegnis.

References

External links

  Official website

Cities and towns in Friuli-Venezia Giulia